William Stern may refer to:
 William Stern (businessman) (1935–2020), owner of the British Stern Group of companies
 William Stern (psychologist) (1871–1938), German psychologist and philosopher
 William Stern, father of American surrogate child Baby M
William Joseph Stern (1891–1965), physicist and jet engine developer
William M. Stern, rabbi at Temple Sinai in Oakland, California
Bill Stern (1907–1971), American actor and sportscaster

See also
William T. Stearn (1911–2001), British botanist
Bill Stearns (1853–1898), American baseball player